Institut Supérieur de Formation Professionnelle (ISFOP) is a private University at Cotonou, Benin, established by the ISFOP Educational Foundation.

References

External links
 Ministry of Education Benin Republic http://mesrs-bj.org/index.php/les-universites/universites-privees
  Benin Republic Education http://www.education.benin.bj/index.php/orientation/enseignement-superieur/etablissements-prives-denseignement-superieur/repertoire-des-centres-prives-denseignement-superieur?showall=&start=1
 

Universities in Benin
Education in Cotonou